The Fucino is a river in Italy. It is located in the province of Teramo in the Abruzzo region of southern Italy. The river is a tributary of the Vomano. Its source is Lake Campotosto near the border with the province of L'Aquila. The river flows northeast before joining the Vomano south of Crognaleto.

References

Rivers of the Province of Teramo
Rivers of Italy
Adriatic Italian coast basins